Ice Pickin' is a studio album by Albert Collins, released in 1978. It was Collins's breakthrough album. Ice Pickin''' was nominated for a 1979 Grammy Award.

Production
The album was recorded at Curtom Studios, in Chicago. The Guardian wrote of Collins's guitar technique: "Collins had developed a highly distinctive approach to the guitar, tuning it to a D minor chord and using a capo high up the neck to achieve a sharp, brilliant effect, his 'ice-cold, sheet-metal sound' that was mirrored in the name of his band, The Icebreakers."

Critical reception
The Bay State Banner thought that "when Collins cooks, with fluent riffs and humorous vocals plus innovative tuning and incorporation of minor blues keys, the result is masterful." The Rolling Stone Album Guide wrote that the album "burrows down to the real nitty gritty of urban existence ... it's one of the best '70s blues albums." The Chicago Tribune called the album "a classic." The Iowa City Press-Citizen called it "a cool, invigorating blast across the era's barren blues landscape." The Dayton Daily News wrote that Collins "made several other stellar releases before his untimely demise in '93, but none match the muscle and depth of this certifiable classic."Melody Maker deemed it the best blues album of 1978, as did the Montreaux Jazz Festival.

In addition to a four stars out of four rating, the authors of The Penguin Guide to Blues Recordings'' awarded the album a “Crown”, indicating that they considered it to be an exceptional CD, and one that should be part of any blues collection.

Personnel 
Albert Collins - guitar, vocals
Larry Burton - guitar
Allen Batts - keyboards
Aron Burton - bass
Casey Jones - drums
A.C. Reed - tenor saxophone
Chuck Smith - baritone saxophone

Track listing 
"Honey, Hush! (Talking Woman Blues)" (Lowell Fulson, Washington) - 04:28
"When the Welfare Turns Its Back on You" (Lucious Porter Weaver, Sonny Thompson) - 05:26
"Ice Pick" (Collins) - 03:08
"Cold, Cold Feeling" (Jessie Mae Robinson) - 05:19
"Too Tired" (Saul Bihari, Maxwell Davis, Johnny "Guitar" Watson) - 03:00
"Master Charge" (Gwen Collins) - 05:12
"Conversation with Collins" (Collins) - 08:52
"Avalanche" (Collins) - 02:39

Liner notes
According to the inside cover of the album:

References

External links 
 Albert Collins Alligator Website

1978 albums
Albert Collins albums
Albums produced by Bruce Iglauer
Alligator Records albums